Deh-e Gami (also Romanized as Deh-e Gamī) is a village in Abreis Rural District, Bazman District, Iranshahr County, Sistan and Baluchestan Province, Iran. At the 2006 census, its population was 38, in 8 families.

References 

Populated places in Iranshahr County